Oedipoda coerulea, the Iberian band-winged grasshopper, is a species of band-winged grasshopper in the family Acrididae. It is found in Europe.

The IUCN conservation status of Oedipoda coerulea is "LC", least concern, with no immediate threat to the species' survival. The IUCN status was assessed in 2015.

References

External links

 

Oedipodinae
Insects described in 1884
Orthoptera of Europe